Voznesenka is a rural locality (a village) in Gafuriysky Selsoviet, Buzdyaksky District, Bashkortostan, Russia. The population was 181 as of 2010. There are 3 streets.

Geography 
Voznesenka is located 5 km south of Buzdyak (the district's administrative centre) by road. Buzdyak is the nearest rural locality.

References 

Rural localities in Buzdyaksky District